St James Church, Southwick is the Church of England parish church of Southwick, Hampshire, England. The parish is part of the Diocese of Portsmouth.

The church is designated a Grade I listed building by Historic England.

The church has a Perpendicular tower and chancel. The west window is 14th century. Inside there is a 17th-century gallery supported by twisted wooden columns. The box pews, altar rail and pulpit also date from the 17th century.

References

Grade I listed churches in Hampshire
Church of England church buildings in Hampshire